Diving at the 2009 Asian Youth Games was held in the Toa Payoh Swimming Complex from 30 June to 1 July 2009 in Singapore.

Medalists

Boys

Girls

Medal table

Results

Boys

3 m springboard
30 June

Platform
1 July

Girls

3 m springboard
1 July

Platform
30 June

References
 Official site

2009 Asian Youth Games events
2009 in diving